Kasaři is a 1958 Czechoslovak film. The film starred Josef Kemr.

References

External links
 

1958 films
Czechoslovak crime comedy films
1950s Czech-language films
Czech crime comedy films
1950s Czech films